John Essington may refer to:

John Essington (MP for Aylesbury)
John Essington (MP for New Romney)